Bryn Gatland (born 10 May 1995) is a New Zealand rugby union player who currently plays as a fly-half for  in New Zealand's domestic Mitre 10 Cup and the Chiefs in the international Super Rugby competition. Gatland is the son of former rugby union footballer and coach Warren Gatland.

Youth career

Born and raised in Waikato, Gatland attended Southwell School where he played first XI cricket & first team Rugby. Later while at Hamilton Boys' High School, his late drop goal in the final helped Boys High lift the 2013 Top 4 first XV title against Saint Kentigern College.

Senior career

His decision to move to Harbour proved to be an enlightened one as his form at Fly Half saw the more experienced Matt McGahan shifted to fullback to accommodate him.

On 8 April 2017 Gatland was named on the Blues bench for the match against the Highlanders to cover for the injured Ihaia West. However he was not used and did not make his Super Rugby debut.

A week later, on 15 April 2017, he made his debut from the bench against the Hurricanes. He converted a try and a penalty kick, scoring his first Super Rugby points.

Gatland became a regular starter for the Blues in the 2018 Super Rugby season, with injuries to Stephen Perofeta and Otere Black.

References

1995 births
Living people
Blues (Super Rugby) players
Chiefs (rugby union) players
Highlanders (rugby union) players
New Zealand rugby union coaches
New Zealand rugby union players
North Harbour rugby union players
People educated at Hamilton Boys' High School
Rugby union fly-halves
Rugby union players from Huntly, New Zealand
Waikato rugby union players